Taxodioideae is a subfamily in Cupressaceae.

Genera

See also
 Taxodiaceae

References

Cupressaceae
Plant subfamilies